Last place or Last Place may refer to:

In sports, a team at the bottom of the standings, see Sports league ranking
Last Place (album), a 2017 album by Grandaddy
The Last Place, a 2011 album by Army Navy